Genrikh Ivanovich Sidorenkov (August 11, 1931 – January 5, 1990) was a Russian ice hockey player who played in the Soviet Hockey League.

He was born in Moscow, Soviet Union.

He played for Krylya Sovetov Moscow and HC CSKA Moscow. He was inducted into the Russian and Soviet Hockey Hall of Fame in 1956.

External links
 Russian and Soviet Hockey Hall of Fame bio

1931 births
1990 deaths
HC CSKA Moscow players
Ice hockey players at the 1956 Winter Olympics
Ice hockey players at the 1960 Winter Olympics
Krylya Sovetov Moscow players
Olympic bronze medalists for the Soviet Union
Olympic gold medalists for the Soviet Union
Olympic ice hockey players of the Soviet Union
Ice hockey people from Moscow
SKA Saint Petersburg players
Olympic medalists in ice hockey
Medalists at the 1956 Winter Olympics
Medalists at the 1960 Winter Olympics